Margaret Vandemore Gillespie is a Democratic member of the South Dakota House of Representatives, representing the 16th District since 2001. Her district includes Lincoln and Union counties.

Gillespie is an attorney living in Hudson, South Dakota.

External links
South Dakota Legislature - Representative Margaret V. Gillespie official SD House website
Project Vote Smart - Representative Margaret V. Gillespie (SD) profile
Follow the Money - Margaret V Gillespie
2006 2004 2002 2000 campaign contributions

Democratic Party members of the South Dakota House of Representatives
1969 births
Living people
Women state legislators in South Dakota
21st-century American women politicians
21st-century American politicians
20th-century American lawyers
21st-century American lawyers
South Dakota lawyers
People from Hawarden, Iowa
People from Lincoln County, South Dakota
20th-century American women lawyers
21st-century American women lawyers